Donbass Arena (is a stadium with a natural grass pitch in Donetsk, Ukraine, that opened on 29 August 2009. The facility is located in the center of the city, in the Lenin Comsomol park. With a capacity of 52,187 spectators, the stadium used to host FC Shakhtar Donetsk matches and also hosted some matches of Euro 2012. The final cost of construction for Donbass Arena was $400M. The stadium has been unused and closed to the public since May 2014, due to the war in Donbas.

The name of the stadium represents the simplified and shortened name of the Donets Basinhuge industrial region of Donbas, henceDonbas (Ukrainian: Донецький басейн or Донбас).

Construction and design

Construction began in 2006. The general contractor was a Turkish company ENKA. The Stadium was completed and opened in 2009. About 1,600 specialists, mainly Turkish, were involved in the construction.

Donbass Arena was designed by ArupSport. It was Project Managed by Arup Major Projects (Project Director Charles Goddard).  Arup Sport also designed the City of Manchester Stadium (Manchester, England), Allianz Arena (Munich, Germany) and the Beijing National Stadium (Beijing, China). The soaring roof effect makes the Stadium resemble a flying saucer. The stadium has an oval shape and a glazed façade and is located near Regional Sport Complex Olimpiyskiy. The roof of the stadium slopes from north to south matching the landscape and contributing to the natural lighting and airing of the pitch. The external lighting makes the Stadium shine at night. A major design consideration was the ongoing protection of as much of the forest setting as possible (each tree having been planted in commemoration of deceased family members in the Great Patriotic War, and the exclusion zones to the neighbouring war memorials. A major geotechnical fault exists some 100m below the ground directly under the centre-spot. The building's foundations and piling was a major sub-project.

Opening

The Donbass Arena was completed ahead of schedule, but the grand opening was delayed until 29 August 2009 to coincide with the Ukrainian holiday of Miners Day, as well as Donetsk City day. Donetsk is in the Donbas region, a mining region, and the date was chosen for its symbolism. The primary tenant of the facility is the local professional football club Shakhtar Donetsk ("Donetsk Coal Miners").

American Pop/R&B singer-songwriter Beyoncé Knowles performed a show from her I Am... World Tour on the opening night of the new stadium. It was Knowles' first performance in Ukraine. Beyoncé performed her famous hit Halo to honour the memory of Michael Jackson, who would have had his birthday on that day.

Many state officials attended the show designed by K-events Filmmaster Group. The opening ceremony was awarded as Event of the Year at the Stadium Business Awards on 18 June 2010 in Dublin.

Shakhtar Donetsk's first match at the stadium was a 4–0 victory in a 2009–10 Ukrainian Premier League fixture on 27 September 2009 against FC Obolon Kyiv. The first international game took place on 18 November 2009 against Greece, which Ukraine lost 0–1 failing to qualify for the 2010 FIFA World Cup.

UEFA Euro 2012 matches
Donbass Arena was included in the official bidding project submitted by Poland and Ukraine for hosting UEFA Euro 2012. The stadium was one of the venues for the UEFA Euro 2012. The stadium hosted group D stage games and one quarter-final and one semi-final game (with the other matches in that group played at Olimpiysky National Sports Complex). Unlike most new stadiums being built in Poland and Ukraine, Donbass Arena was not specifically built for the tournament.

The following matches were played at the stadium during the UEFA Euro 2012:

Other uses

The project of new stadium "Donbass Arena" was conceived long before Ukraine was named as co-host of Euro 2012. The owner considered the possibility of daily use of the arena. "Donbass Arena" includes three restaurants, a lounge-bar, a fan cafe, numerous fast-food outlets, retail outlets, a fitness center, corporate boxes and first aid rooms. The stadium also provides facilities for corporate events - presentations, press conferences, celebrations and concerts. Stadium tours are available which include an examination of the unique features of Donbass Arena, a visit to the footballers' rooms and FC Shakhtar Museum and a visit to the FC Shakhtar brand shop for souvenirs.

War in Ukraine

On 20 May 2014, the stadium hosted a small "Peace March" against the violence of the 2014 pro-Russian conflict in Ukraine and the self-proclaimed Donetsk People's Republic.

On 22 August 2014, the stadium was damaged by what was reported to be artillery shelling, as the Ukrainian armed forces clashed with pro-Russian separatists for control of the town.

On 20 October 2014, the stadium was again damaged by what was reported to be artillery shelling. This time, the stadium sustained damage to the east and west sides and at least one large glass panel fell near a young girl.

Since July 2014, due to the danger of the ongoing conflict in Donetsk, Shakhtar used the Arena Lviv in the city of Lviv in western Ukraine (600 miles away from Donetsk) as their temporary home ground. In early 2017, the club moved their home games to the Metalist Stadium in Kharkiv (183 miles to the north of Donetsk). Additionally, the club's administrative headquarters and player training sessions have been re-located to the capital city of Kyiv.

The stadium has remained unused and closed to the public since FC Shakhtar were forced to abandon it. However, despite the on-going conflict, the stadium is slowly being repaired. On 31 May 2018, the field turf was successfully restored.

Russian invasion of Ukraine
In March 2022, during the 2022 Russian invasion of Ukraine, the Donbas Arena Football infrastructure continues to suffer from the war in Ukraine. The main stadium of Donetsk suffered some damage.

Facts

  natural turf will be used with  synthetic turf
 The total area of the construction site (including mobilization areas) is 254,907 m2
 The land (including pitch), where the Stadium is located, is 46,780 m2
 The height of the new stadium is 54m from pitch level to the top of the roof.
 There are 227 lavatories with 471 toilets and 333 wash basins.
 Over 120,000 m³ of concrete were poured during construction of the Stadium
 Approximately 4,300 tonnes of steel were used for construction
 Approximately 3,800 tonnes of steel were used for the roof structure.
 Total glazing area is approximately 24,000 m2
 The total area of the tiers is approximately 70,000 m2
 The size of the football field is

References

External links

 Donbass Arena official website
 Rinat Akhmetov: The new stadium's name is Donbass Arena

FC Shakhtar Donetsk
Football venues in Donetsk Oblast
UEFA Euro 2012 stadiums in Ukraine
Sport in Donetsk
Sports venues completed in 2009
Buildings and structures in Donetsk
Tourist attractions in Donetsk Oblast
SCM Holdings
Sports venues in Donetsk Oblast